This is a list of singers and musicians from Sudan, in alphabetical order.

Salah ibn Al Badiya (1937-2019)
Al-Nour Al-Jilani (1944-2022)
Mahmoud Abdulaziz
Sharhabil Ahmed
Nancy Ajaj
Alsarah (1982–present)
Mohammed al Amin
Mohamed Badawi (born 1965)
Al Balabil
Ramey Dawoud, Sudanese-American singer
Aisha al-Falatiya
Gawaher
Omer Ihsas
Emmanuel Jal, also connected to South Sudan and Kenya
Abdel Karim Karouma
Abdel Aziz El Mubarak
Khojali Osman (died 1994)
Rasha
Ayman al-Rubo
Abdel Gadir Salim
Mostafa Sid Ahmed (1953–1996)
Mohammed Wardi (1932-2012)
Nada al-Qalaa

Lyricists

The Ambassadors
Elhadi Adam (1926–2006)
Ismail Hassan
Ramey Dawoud

 
Sudanese